Fenton Parkway station is a station on San Diego Trolley's Green Line. This street-level station has side platforms. It is located near Fenton Parkway and the San Diego River. The station is near a large apartment complex, several office parks, and Fenton Marketplace in the Mission Valley East neighborhood.

This station opened on September 19, 2000, as an 'infill' station (i.e. it was not an original station when the line opened in 1997). As such, Fenton Parkway is the only infill station on the current Green Line. It was served by Blue Line trolleys until July 2005, when service between Old Town Transit Center and Mission San Diego (and points eastward) was replaced by Green Line upon its introduction in conjunction with the opening of the Mission Valley East extension.

Station layout
There are two tracks, each served by a side platform.

See also
 List of San Diego Trolley stations

References

Green Line (San Diego Trolley)
San Diego Trolley stations in San Diego
Railway stations in the United States opened in 2000
2000 establishments in California